The Government Islamia Graduate College Sangla Hill (GIGCS) previously known as Government Islamia Postgraduate College Sangla Hill, is a Government College located in Sangla Hill, in the Nankana Sahib District of Punjab, Pakistan.

History 
Founded on 10 September 1966 as an intermediate college for boys and promoted to a degree college in 1985.

Academics 
GIGCS is organised into two divisions, the science and arts division. These divisions are further categorised as academic departments. The core departments include commerce, computer science, chemistry, biology, physics, English, Islamic studies, Urdu, history, political science, geography, education, mathematics, economics and statistics.

Faculties
There are two faculties with 12 departments. It has 21 full-time faculty members involved in teaching (1267 students) 
 Faculty of Art
 Faculty of Science

Programs offered 
College is currently offering educational programs at four levels (intermediate, associate, undergraduate and graduate).

Intermediate programs 
College provides (12-year education) Intermediate (2-Year) program at Intermediate level. College is affiliated with BISE Lahore which has allowed these programs:
 F.Sc Pre-engineering
 F.Sc Pre-medical
 I.C.S
 FA General science
 FA (IT)
 FA

Associate degree programs - ADP 
College provides (14-year education) Associate (2-Year) program at the Associate level. College is affiliated with University of the Punjab which has allowed these programs:
ADA (B.A)
ADS (B.Sc.)

Undergraduate programs
College provides (16-year education) BS Honors (4-Year) co-education program at the undergraduate level. The college will be affiliated with Government College University Faisalabad which has allowed these programs:
 BS Chemistry

Master's degree programs
College provides (16-year education) Master (2-Year) co-education program at the Graduate level. College is affiliated with University of the Punjab which has allowed these programs:
MA Urdu
MA Islamiyat
MA English

Gallery

References

External links
Official website

Public universities and colleges in Punjab, Pakistan
Universities and colleges in Nankana Sahib District
Educational institutions established in 1966
1966 establishments in Pakistan
Academic institutions in Pakistan